St Helens Hospital is a health facility at St Helens, Merseyside. It is managed by the St Helens and Knowsley Teaching Hospitals NHS Trust.

History
The hospital has its origins in a cottage hospital in Marshall Cross Road which opened in 1873. The hospital joined the National Health Service in 1948. A scheme to rebuild the hospital was procured under a Private Finance Initiative contract in 2006. The works were carried out by Vinci, as part of a scheme with Whiston Hospital, at a cost of £338 million. It was completed in 2008 and was officially opened by the Duke of York in 2010.

References

NHS hospitals in England
Hospitals in Merseyside